Zdětín is a municipality and village in Mladá Boleslav District in the Central Bohemian Region of the Czech Republic. It has about 600 inhabitants.

Etymology
The name is derived from the personal name Zďata, meaning "Zďata's (court)".

Geography
It lies in a flat landscape of the Jizera Table.

History
The first written mention of Zdětín is from 1189.

Sights
The landmark of Zdětín is the Church of All Saints. It is a Gothic cemetery church from the 14th century with Baroque modifications.

References

External links

Villages in Mladá Boleslav District